C. S. Giscombe (born 1950 Dayton, Ohio) is an African-American poet, essayist, and professor of English at University of California, Berkeley.

Life
A graduate of SUNY at Albany and Cornell University where he earned degrees, he was editor of Epoch magazine in the 1970s and 1980s. He has taught at Cornell University, Syracuse University, Illinois State University, and Pennsylvania State University.
As of 2015, he teaches at University of California, Berkeley.

His work has appeared in Callaloo, Chicago Review, Hambone, Iowa Review, Boundary 2, etc.. Giscombe’s honors and awards include the Stephen Henderson Award in Poetry, the American Book Award, and the Carl Sandburg Prize. As well as fellowships from the National Endowment for the Arts, the Fund for Poetry, the Council for the International Exchange of Scholars, and the Canadian Embassy. There have been a plethora of acknowledgments throughout Giscombe's career.

Giscombe has also worked as a taxi driver, a hospital orderly, and a railroad brakeman. He acknowledges his childhood fascination with trains as having an influence in his writing, noting that the railroad is "not sentimental...continuous...intimately connected to features of land and water."

Awards
 1998 Carl Sandburg Award for Giscome Road.
 2008 American Book Award for Prairie Style 
 2010 Stephen Henderson Award.
 Fellowships and grants from the Canadian Embassy to the United States, the Fund for Poetry, the Illinois Arts Council, the National Endowment for the Arts, the New York Foundation for the Arts, etc.

Works
Similarly.  Dalkey Archive Press.  2021. .
Train Music. (with Judith Margolis). Omnidawn Press. 2021.  .
Border Towns.  Dalkey Archive Press. 2016.  .
Ohio Railroads. Omnidawn Press. 2014. .
Prairie Style. Dalkey Archive Press. 2008. .
Inland.  Leroy Chapbooks. 2001.

Two Sections from "Practical Geography."  Diæresis Press. 1999.

At Large. St. Lazaire Press. 1989.
Postcards. Ithaca House. 1977. .

References

External links
"Prairie Style: An interview with C.S. Giscombe", Poetry Foundation
"C.S. Giscombe", Electronic Poetry Center
"C.S. Giscombe", PennSound
"Review of Giscome Road'" in Samizdat'''

Living people
American male poets
University at Albany, SUNY alumni
Cornell University alumni
Cornell University faculty
Syracuse University faculty
Illinois State University faculty
Pennsylvania State University faculty
University of California, Berkeley College of Letters and Science faculty
1950 births
African-American poets
Writers from Dayton, Ohio
American Book Award winners
American taxi drivers
21st-century African-American people
20th-century African-American people
African-American male writers